This is a list of notable people from what is now the county of Merseyside, including those from the city of Liverpool.

A 
 Jacqui Abbott: Singer with The Beautiful South.
 Gary Ablett: Liverpool F.C. and Everton F.C. footballer.
 Cyril Abraham: Creator and writer of The Onedin Line.
 Derek Acorah: Radiopsychic and author.
 Alan A'Court: Footballer represented England national football team in the 1958 FIFA World Cup.
 John Aldridge: Footballer, Liverpool F.C. Republic of Ireland international.
 Nicky Allt: Playwright.
 Major General Ernest Wright Alexander VC CB CMG: Recipient of the Victoria Cross during World War I.
 Jean Alexander: Actress played Hilda Ogden on the long-running soap opera Coronation Street, and Auntie Wainwright in Last of the Summer Wine.
 Trent Alexander-Arnold: Footballer, Liverpool F.C. and England international.
 Peter Allen: Wallasey-born killer, who along with his accomplice Gwynn Owen Evens became the last judicial executions by capital punishment in United Kingdom.
 Marc Almond: Singer-songwriter.
 Jeannette Altwegg: Figure Skating, 1952 Winter Olympics Gold medalist, brought up in Liverpool from the age of two.
 Chris Amoo: singer-songwriter, The Real Thing.
 Charles Anderson: Victoria Cross recipient.
 Freya Anderson: Swimmer, Gold medalists in the 2020 Summer Olympics.
 Rupert Anderson: Footballer, Merseyside's first England international.
 Martyn Andrews: TV presenter, journalist, singer and actor
 Michael Angelis: Actor, played TV roles such as Lucien Boswell in The Liver Birds, Chrissie Todd in Boys from the Black Stuff and as narrator of Thomas & Friends.
 Paul Angelis: Actor, most famous for playing Ringo in The Beatles' Yellow Submarine (film) and Karageorge in the James Bond film For Your Eyes Only (film).
 Richard Ansdell: Artist.
 John Archer: First black mayor in London (Battersea).
 Jimmy Ashcroft: Footballer, England international.
 April Ashley: Model, restaurant hostess and transsexual rights campaigner.
 Arthur Askey: Comedian.
Neil Aspinall: Music Executive of Apple Corps and managing director of Apple Records.
Ian Astbury: Musician, Singer and songwriter  in the rock band The Cult, lead singer in the American rock  band The Doors of the 21st Century.
 Blanche Atkinson: Victorian novelist and children's writer.
 Graham Atkinson: Footballer.
 Frederick Attock: The first President and founder of Newton Heath L&YR FC that later became Manchester United F.C.

B 
 Beryl Bainbridge: Writer, nominated several times for the Booker Prize.
 Lilian Bader: (1918–2015) One of the first black woman to join the British Armed Forces.
 James Baines: Shipping magnate, owner of the Black Ball line.
 John Bailey: Footballer, Everton F.C.
 Leighton Baines: Footballer, Everton F.C. England international.
 Frederick Barrett: RMS Titanic survivor.
 Tony Barrow:  Music Manager of The Kinks, The Bee Gees,  Bay City Rollers, and others.
 James Barton: founder of Cream and Creamfields, President of Electronic dance music at Live Nation Entertainment.
 Joe Baker: Footballer, England international.
 Tom Baker: Actor famous for his portrayal of the lead role in Doctor Who in the 1970s and 1980s.
 John Ball: The Open Championship winner, inducted into the World Golf Hall of Fame. Also a Blue plaque at Royal Liverpool Golf Club.
 Matthew Ball: Principal dancer with The Royal Ballet
 Michael Ball: Footballer, Rangers F.C. and PSV Eindhoven and England international.
 Shirley Ballas: Ballroom dancer & TV personality.
 Billy Balmer: Footballer, England international, brother of Everton F.C. footballer Bob Balmer.
 Jack Balmer: Footballer Liverpool F.C.
 Leslie Banks: Actor.
 Paul Barber: Actor who played Denzil Tulser in Only Fools and Horses.
 Clive Barker: Author, director and visual artist.
Ross Barkley: Footballer, England international.
 Joey Barton: Football manager and footballer.
 Hogan Bassey: Nigerian world boxing champion, lived in Liverpool.
 Margaret Beavan: Politician
 Peter Beckett: Musician, singer and songwriter who got number one hit in US with Baby Come Back.
 Thomas Beecham: Conductor and Impresario .
 Richard Beddows: Recipient of the Medal of Honor in the American Civil War.
 Tom Bell: Actor in Prime Suspect, The Krays and Wish You Were Here.
 Tony Bellew: Professional boxer, former WBC World Cruiserweight champion,
 Mitch Benn: Comedian and songwriter, known for his work on BBC Radio 2 and 4.
James Theodore Bent: Explorer Archaeologist,and author.
Arthur Berry (footballer) England international who won Gold medal in the 1908 and 1912 summer Olympics.
 Judith Berry (née. Hawkins): Mother of American actress Halle Berry.
 Leanne Best: Actress.
 Pete Best: Early member of The Beatles
 John Bibby: Founder of the Bibby Line, the world's oldest independently owned shipping line and one of Britain's oldest family controlled companies.
 Wayne Bickerton: Songwriter and Record producer
 John Birt: Former Director General of the BBC, Member of the House of Lords.
 John Bishop: Comedian.
 James Gordon Partridge Bisset: Second officer of the  that rescued 712 Titanic survivors, Captain both  and  that delivered 447,777 troops to various theatres of conflict during World War II.
 Cilla Black: Singer, entertainer and presenter of the long-running television show Blind Date.
Grey Blake: British actor.
 Alan Bleasdale: TV dramatist.
 Gary Bleasdale: Actor and playwright.
 Chris Boardman:  Cyclist, gold medallist at the 1992 Olympics.
 Stan Boardman: Comedian.
Phil Boersma: Footballer.
 Jean Boht: Actress.
 Alfred Allen Booth: Ship-owner,  Alfred Booth and Company, father of television producer Sir Philip Booth, 2nd Baronet and grandfather of Douglas Allen Booth.
 Charles Booth: Pioneer in social research, Blue plaque marks is former home at Grenville Place.
 Henry Booth: Inventor and director of the world's first inter-city railway
 Lewis Booth: Executive Vice-president at the Ford Motor Company, Director of Rolls-Royce.
 Tony Booth: Actor and father of Cherie Booth. Played Mike Rawlins in the sitcom Till Death Us Do Part.
 Lord Ian Botham: Cricketer.
 Eddie Braben: Comedy writer and performer.
 Bessie Braddock: Labour politician, represented Liverpool electorate of Exchange for 24 years.
 Doug Bradley: Actor, best known as Pinhead from his best friend Clive Barker's Hellraiser films.
 Harry Bradshaw (footballer, born 1873): Liverpool F.C. first ever England international.
 Henry Arthur Bright: Businessman, Managing partner  in Gibbs, Bright & Co. That owned .
 Stan Brittain: cyclists, Olympic silver medalist.
 Bernard Beryl Brodie: (1907–1989) he is considered by many to be the founder of modern Pharmacology.
 Maurice Brodie: (1903–1939) Virologist, who developed a Polio vaccine in 1935, brother of Bernard Beryl Brodie.
 John Alexander Brodie: English civil engineer.
 Tom Bromilow: Footballer, Liverpool F.C. and England international.
 Jack Brooks (lyricist). Songwriter, of That's Amore and Ole Buttermilk Sky.
 Robbie Brookside: Professional wrestler.
 John Brophy (writer) Author of over 40 books; some adapted to film.
 Ian Broudie: Singer with the Lightning Seeds.
 Andy Brown: Vocalist and guitarist of the band Lawson.
 Faith Brown: Comedian, singer and actress.
 Tom Brown: Major league baseball player
 Sir William Brown, 1st Baronet, of Richmond Hill: Banker, founder of Brown Shipley, partner in family firm Alex. Brown & Sons the first Investment Bank in United States.
Henry Brunner: Chemist and businessman, director of Brunner Mond.
Sir John Brunner, 1st Baronet: Chemical industrialist and politician, co-founded Brunner Mond and Imperial Chemical Industries.
 Neil Buchanan: Television presenter/producer best known for presenting Art Attack
 James Dunwoody Bulloch: Confederate Foreign agent based in Liverpool during the American Civil War, uncle of U.S. President Theodore Roosevelt.
 David Burke: Actor, played Watson in early episodes of Granada's Sherlock Holmes.
 Andy Burnham: Politician, Member of Parliament.
 Pete Burns: Musician, founder of Dead or Alive.
 Malandra Burrows: Actress Born in Woolton. Played Kathy Glover in Emmerdale.
 Frank Bustard: Established the Atlantic Steam Navigation Company, pioneered the world's first Roll-on/roll-off ferry service.
 Angela Buxton: Tennis player.
 Gerry Byrne (footballer, born 1938): Liverpool FC footballer who was also a member of the 1966 FIFA World Cup England international squad.

C 
 Ian Callaghan: Liverpool FC most appearances record holder and one of only three Englishman to win the 1966 FIFA World Cup and the European Cup.
 Ramsey Campbell: Novelist.
 George Q. Cannon: First Counselor, The Church of Jesus Christ of Latter-day Saints and Congressman for the State of Utah.
 Larry Carberry: Footballer.
 Mary Birkett Card: Abolitionist and feminist poet.
 W. D. Caröe: Architect.
 Jamie Carragher: Footballer, Liverpool F.C. and England international and Sky Sports football commentator.
 Nathan Carter: Anglo-Irish country singer.
 Jesse Carver: Footballer, former manager of Inter Milan and Juventus F.C. winning the Serie A.
 Jimmy Case: Footballer, Liverpool F.C. Won three European Cup winners medals.
 Howie Casey: Musician.
 Kim Cattrall: Actress, played Samantha Jones in Sex and the City'.'
 Jimmy Cauty: Musician, artist and record producer, co-founder of electronic band The KLF with Bill Drummond.
 Craig Charles: Actor, comedian and DJ. Played Dave Lister in Red Dwarf, Lloyd Mullaney in Coronation Street; host of BBC radio Funk and Soul Show and previously Robot Wars.
 Noel Godfrey Chavasse: One of only three people to be awarded a Victoria Cross twice,  brought up in Liverpool from the age of six.
 Keith Chegwin ("Cheggers"): Television presenter. Brother of Janice Long.
Melanie C: Singer and songwriter, Merseyside born, brought up in nearby Widnes, a member of the Spice Girls.
 Abbey Clancy: Lingerie and catwalk model and television presenter, married to footballer Peter Crouch.
 Emma Clarke: Considered to be the first known black woman footballer in Britain.
John Clayton (rugby union): Played in the world's first international rugby match, and also the first international match in any code of football.
Stephen Clemence: Footballer, the son of England international Ray Clemence.
Fred E. Cliffe: Songwriter.
 Anne Clough: Early suffragette in the 1800s.
 Connor Coady: Footballer,  England international.
 George A. Cobham Jr.: Brevet Brigadier General in the American Civil War.
 Tony Coleman: Footballer.
 Ray Colfar: Professional footballer.
 Lewis Collins: Actor, born in Bidston. Played Bodie in The Professionals.
 Jodie Comer: Actress. Played Villanelle in Killing Eve Tommy Comerford: Gangster.
 John Connelly: Footballer, member of England  1966 FIFA World Cup winning team.
 William Connolly (VC): Victoria Cross recipient.
 John Constantine: Fictional working class magician and con artist in DC Comics.
 John Conteh: Professional boxer, former WBC World Light heavyweight champion.
 Brian Cooke: Comedy writer known for creating sitcoms Father, Dear Father, Man About the House, George and Mildred, Robin's Nest and Keep it in the Family  .
 Johnny Cooke: Professional boxer, former British and Commonwealth Welterweight champion.
 John Conway: Mathematician active in combinatorial game theory.
 Rosie Cooper: Member of Parliament.
 Kenneth Cope: Actor.
 Steve Coppell: Footballer, England international.
 Richard Corbett MEP for Merseyside 1996–1999 and Yorkshire & Humber 1999–2009.
 Elvis Costello: Singer and songwriter inducted into the Rock and Roll Hall of Fame.
 Harry Cotterell: Trader and chairman of African Association, Ltd.
 Frank Cottrell-Boyce: Screenwriter, Novelists, Actor.
 Gabriel Coury: Recipient of the Victoria Cross.
 Sir Henry Coward: (1849–1944) Pioneer Choral Master conductor, A Blue plaque marks is former home.
 Alex Cox: Film director.
 Jack Cox (footballer) Liverpool FC and England International footballer.
 Michael Cox: Singer and actor best known for his 1960 Top Ten hit Angela Jones.
 Sir Anthony Douglas Cragg: British Sculpture.
 Daniel Craig: Actor, raised on the Wirral, attending junior school, high school and sixth form college there; also lived in Liverpool with his mother and sister.
 Walter Crane: Illustrator.
 Peter Craven: Motorcycle racer, two-time winner on the Speedway World Championship.
Aaron Cresswell: Footballer, England International.
Julian Creus: Weightlifter Olympic medalist.
Charles Crichton: Film Director.
John Cropper: Shipping magnate who attended the World Anti-Slavery Convention in 1840.
Walter Citrine, 1st Baron Citrine: A leading twentieth century Trade unionist who was in The Black Book (list).
Will Cuff: Football manager, league and FA cup winning manager and Chairman of Everton F.C.
Peter Culshaw: Professional boxer, former WBU and Commonwealth Flyweight champion.
Steve Cummings: Racing cyclist Olympic medalist.
 Edwina Currie: Member of Parliament, government minister and author.
 Chris Curtis: Drummer and singer, known for being in  Merseybeat band The Searchers, He originated the concept behind Rock band Deep Purple.

 D 
 George Davies: Popular fashion businessman.
 Dickie Davies: Television presenter.
 Bill Davies (golfer): Member of the 1933 Ryder Cup team held at Southport and Ainsdale Golf Club.
 Robbie Davies Jr.: Professional boxer, British, Commonwealth, and European champion.
 Terence Davies: Film director.
 Paul Dawber: Actor, Neighbours, Sons & Daughters, The Novelist.
 Matt Dawson: Rugby union player, Member of England 2003 Rugby World Cup winning team.
 Dixie Dean: Footballer, Everton F.C., number two on the List of footballers in England by number of league goals.
 Carol Decker: Singer, lead vocalist with T'Pau.
 Les Dennis: Comedian and actor. Presented Family Fortunes (1987–2002), played Michael Rodwell in Coronation Street.
 Jazza Dickens: Professional boxer, IBO World Champion Featherweight.
 Michael Dixon: Cricket umpire.
Lottie Dod:Tennis player, five-time winner of Wimbledon Ladies Championship.
 Ken Dodd: Comedian, Singer and entertainer.
 Tony Dodson: Professional boxer, former British Super middleweight champion.
 Cyril Done: Footballer. Liverpool F.C.
 Arthur Dooley: Artist and sculptor.
 Brian Dooley: Writer of The Smoking Room.
 James Francis Doyle: Architect.
 Ryan Doyle: two-time freerunning world champion.
 Toni Duggan: Footballer.
 Aynsley Dunbar: Musician,  Drummer, inducted into the Rock and Roll Hall of Fame as a member of American Rock band Journey.
 William Henry Duncan: Britain's first Chief Medical Officers (United Kingdom)
 Paul Du Noyer: Music journalist and author of Liverpool: Wondrous Place.
 Franklin Dyall: Actor and film director, Atlantic (film)

 E 
 William Earle (1833–1885) British Army Officer.
 Bill Eckersley: Footballer, represented the England national football team in the 1950 FIFA World Cup.
 Taron Egerton: Actor.
 Peter Ellis: British architect, inventor of the Paternoster lift.
 Jennifer Ellison: Actress.
 Fred Emney: Comedy actor.
 Brian Epstein: inducted into the Rock and Roll Hall of Fame in 2014 as the manager of The Beatles.
 Terry Etim: Former UFC fighter.
 Arthur Evans: Recipient of the Victoria Cross.
 Mal Evans: The Beatles road manager, Record producer for rock band Badfinger.
 Shaun Evans: Actor, most famous for playing Morse in the ITV series, Endeavour.
 Roy Evans: Footballer, Manager of Liverpool F.C.
 Tom Evans: Musician/composer most notable for his work with the band Badfinger.
 Kenny Everett: DJ and comic. Born in Seaforth.
 William Ewart (British politician) Pioneer of the idea of Blue plaque.

 F 
 Joe Fagan: Footballer, coach of twenty seven years under Bill Shankly and Bob Paisley, the first manager to win three major competitions in one season.
 David Fairclough: Footballer, Liverpool F.C. and was one of the six Liverpool-born players to win the 1977 European Cup Final and 1978 European Cup Final.
 William Fawcett (engineer): noted for is steam engines for the William Fawcett described as the first ship operated by P&O shipping line, Also the   credited with being the first crossing of the Atlantic Ocean almost entirely by steam power.
 John Fay: TV scriptwriter and playwright.
 Leslie Fenton: Actor and Film director. 
 Rebecca Ferguson: Singer and songwriter.
 Sebastian Ziani de Ferranti: inventor, founder of Ferranti that built and produced the Ferranti Mark 1  the world's first commercial computer.
 Fred Ferris: Actor and comedian.
 Rocky Fielding: Professional boxer, British and Commonwealth super middleweight champion.
 Luke Fildes: Painter, a Blue plaque marks his former home Woodland House.
 Neil Fitzmaurice: Actor and writer best known as Ray Von in Phoenix Nights.
 Frederick Fleet: British sailor, known for being on look out on the RMS Titanic.
 Gordon Snowy Fleet: Drummer inducted into the ARIA Hall of Fame as a member of The Easybeats.
 Tommy Fleetwood: Professional Golfer.
 Alex Fletcher: Played Jacquie Dixon in ‘’Brookside’’, Currently plays Diane O'Connor in Hollyoaks.
 John Foster (architect, born 1786).
 Frederic Franklin: Dancer.
 Helen Forrester: Author, wrote books (including Tuppence to Cross the Mersey) about her childhood from privileged child to slum kid in Liverpool in the 1930s
 Tony Forsyth: Stage and screen actor
 William Bower Forwood: Lord Mayor of Liverpool, director of the Cunard Line and the Bank of Liverpool.
 Bill Foulkes: Footballer.
 Anthony Fowler: Professional boxer and 2014 Commonwealth Games gold medallist.
 Robbie Fowler: Footballer, Liverpool F.C. and England international.
 Jenny Frost: Singer and former member of Atomic Kitten.
 Christian Furr: Painter.
 Billy Fury: Pop singer and songwriter.

 G 
 Gerald Gardner: Founder of modern Wicca.
 Howard Gayle: Footballer, Liverpool F.C.
 Tom Georgeson: Actor.
 Alex Gerrard: Model, wife of Steven Gerrard.
 Steven Gerrard: Footballer, Captain of Liverpool F.C. and Captain of the England national football team (114 caps).
 Spyridon Gianniotis: Swimmer, Olympic silver medalist and two time world champion.
 John Gidman: Footballer.
 William Ewart Gladstone: Four-time Prime Minister of the United Kingdom.
 Sir Richard Glazebrook: Physicist.
 Clive Beverley Glynn: Flying ace.
 Lord Peter Goldsmith: British government Attorney General.
 Leon Goossens: Musician.
 Sidonie Goossens: Musician.
 Amelia Elizabeth Roe Gordon: President, Dominion Woman's Christian Temperance Union
 John Gorman: Writer, actor, performer, director and producer
 Caroline Gotch: Artist.
 Cyril Edward Gourley: Victoria Cross recipient.
 James Graham (rugby league): Most Cap player for the England national rugby league team, Captain of the Great Britain national rugby league team.
 Stephen Graham Actor.
 Alex Greenwood: Footballer, Woman's England international.
 Debbie Greenwood: Television presenter, former beauty queen.
 Sam Grey: Actress.
 Chelcee Grimes: Singer and songwriter, footballer.
 John Gustafson (musician) Singer and songwriter, was originally included into the Rock and Roll Hall of Fame among the list of inducted member for Roxy Music however, his name was dropped from the list.
 Deryck Guyler: Comedy actor.

 H 
 Tony Hall, Baron Hall of Birkenhead: Former Director general of the BBC, Member of the House of Lords.
 William Halsall: Marine painter.
 Natasha Hamilton: Singer and former member of Atomic Kitten.
 Russ Hamilton: Singer and songwriter with hits in both UK and US. His song "Rainbow" reached number 10 in US in 1957.
 Harry Hanan: Cartoonist of the syndicated comic strip Louie.
 Tommy Handley: Comedian.
 Gerald Hanley: Novelist and brother of James Hanley.
 James Hanley: Novelist and playwright.
 David Hanson: Politician.
 John Hardman: Businessman, former Chairman of Asda.
 John Hargreaves: Founder of fashion and homeware store Matalan.
 Alan Harper; Footballer, Everton F.C.
 Gus Harris: Mayor of Scarborough, Ontario, Canada from 1978 to 1988.
 George Harrison: Singer and songwriter inducted into the Rock and Roll Hall of Fame as a member of The Beatles. Founder of the Traveling Wilburys and HandMade Films.
 Rex Harrison: Actor famous for My Fair Lady.
 Thomas Harrison (ship-owner): Owner of the Harrison Line.
William Harrison: Captain of the Liverpool ship , ( The largest ship in the world for four decades).
 Bill Harry: Creator of Mersey beat important newspaper of the early 1960s, which focused on the Liverpool music scene. Author of 25 books.
 Ian Hart: Actor known for playing John Lennon in Backbeat and for playing Professor Quirrell in Harry Potter and the Philosopher's Stone (2001).
 Jesse Hartley: Designer and civil engineer of Liverpool Docks including The Royal Albert Dock, Liverpool.
 Colin Harvey: Footballer, manager of Everton F.C.
 Derek Hatton: Controversial former local politician, most famous for his opposition to Margaret Thatcher's Conservative government.
 John Liptrot Hatton:(1810–1886) Composer and singer.
 Paul Heaton: Singer and songwriter with The Beautiful South.
 Rose Heilbron: Barrister and High Court judge.
 Felicia Hemans: Poet, wrote "Casabianca" (The boy stood on the burning deck...).
 Adrian Henri: Painter and poet.
 Joseph W. Herbert: Actor, singer and dramatist.
 Harold Hilton: Golfer, won The Open Championship twice, inducted into the World Golf Hall of Fame.
 George Hinckley: Victoria Cross recipient.
 Les Hinton: journalist, and Chairman of Fox Television Stations and News International and CEO of Dow Jones & Company.
 William Patrick Hitler: Nephew of Adolf Hitler.
 Paul Hodkinson: Professional boxer,  former  WBC World Featherweight Champion.
 Charles Thurstan Holland: Pioneer of radiology who worked and lived in Liverpool.
 Michael Holliday: Singer in the 1950s with a string of chart hits including two number one singles, "The Story of My Life" and "Starry Eyed".
 Andy Holligan: Professional boxer, former two time British and Commonwealth champion.
 Alfred Holt: Shipping magnate, Blue Funnel Line,   the first commercially successful steamship to achieve the fuel economy necessary to trade between China and Britain, co-founder of Singapore Airlines.
 George Holt: Co-founder of the Lamport and Holt shipping Line.
 John Holt: Shipping magnete, founder of John Holt plc, and co-founder of the Liverpool School of Tropical Medicine.
 Robert Durning Holt: First Lord Mayor of Liverpool.
 Peter Hooton: Musician and singer.
 Clive Hornby: Actor, played Jack Sugden in Emmerdale.
 Frank Hornby: Railway toys and Meccano businessman.
 Jeremiah Horrocks: Astronomer.
 Ewart Horsfall: Gold medalist in the 1912 Stockholm Olympic Games, member of the Horsfall family.
 Tommy Horton: MBE Professional Golfer.
 Mary Hottinger (née Mackie): Liverpool born, Scottish translator and editor of crime, ghost and horror stories.
 John Houlding: Lord Mayor of Liverpool and founder of Liverpool Football Club.
 William Huchinson: Dockmaster, Inventor, The world's first Lifeboat station station in Formby.
 Geoffrey Hughes: Actor.
 Graham Hughes: Filmmaker, television presenter, Guinness World Records holder for being the first person to visit all 193 United Nations member states and several other territories across the world without air travel . Founder of Global Scouse Day.
 John Hughes (architect) Gold medalist in the Art competitions at the 1932 Summer Olympics.
 Laurie Hughes: Footballer, Liverpool FC Represented England national football team in the 1950 FIFA World Cup.
 Shirley Hughes: Illustrator and author.
 John Hulley: Gymnasiarch of Liverpool and founder of the British Olympic movement in 1865.
 Paul Humphreys: Musician, co-founded Orchestral Manoeuvres in the Dark.
 Carl Hunter: Film director, screenwriter and Bassist in The Farm (British band).
 Jack Hunter-Spivey: Gold medal-winning Paralympic table tennis player.
 Chris Huston:  Record producer, with The Who, Led Zeppelin and others.
 John Hutchinson: Chemist and industrialist.
 James Hype: DJ and Music Producer.

 I 
 William Imrie: Shipping magnate, Co- founder of the Oceanic Steam Navigation Company known as the White Star Line.
 Philip Ingham: Scientist.
 William Inman: Shipping magnate, owner of the Inman Line.
 Nigel Ipinson: Musician, songwriter, music producer for Orchestral Manoeuvres in the Dark, The Stone Roses, Hot Chocolate (band).
 Colin Irwin: Footballer, Liverpool F.C.
 Jason Isaacs: Actor played Lucius Malfoy in the Harry Potter films.
 J. Bruce Ismay: Chairman of the White star line. Highest-ranking officer to survive the RMS Titanic disaster.
 Thomas Henry Ismay: Established White Star Line in 1868.

 J 
 Amy Jackson: Actor.
 Glenda Jackson: Oscar-winning actress and former Labour Party MP.
 Tony Jackson (singer): member of The Searchers (band).
 Brian Jacques: Bestselling author of the Redwall series of children's fantasy books.
 Daniel Willis James: merchant of Phelps Dodge.
 Frank Linsly James: British Explorer.
 Hilda James: Swimmer, inducted into the International Swimming Hall of Fame.
 Andy Jameson: Swimmer, Olympic medalist.
 Helen Jameson: Swimmer, Olympic medalist.
 William Stanley Jevons: Leading political economist and logician of his time, one of the initiators of the marginal revolution, author of the Jevons Paradox
 Francis Jeffers: Footballer.
 Edward Turner Jeffery: Railway Executive.
 Jet of Iada: Recipient of the Dickin Medal.
 Paul Jewell: Footballer, Club manager.
 David Johnson: Footballer, England international who won three European cups and was one of seven Liverpool born footballers who won the 1981 European Cup Final.
 Holly Johnson: Musician, Frankie Goes to Hollywood singing Relax, the 6th best selling single in the UK.  .
 Joseph Johnson (watch maker).
 Katarina Johnson-Thompson: Heptathlete.
 Sir Thomas Johnson: Largely responsible for the modern city of Liverpool, promoting the Old Dock the world's first commercial Wet Dock.
 Banner Johnstone: Rower, Olympic Gold medalist.
Alfred Jones: Artist.
 Alfred Lewis Jones: Shipping magnate, owner of the Elder Dempster Lines, founder of the Bank of British West Africa and the  Liverpool School of Tropical Medicine.
 Alfred Stowell Jones: Recipient of the Victoria Cross
 Curtis Jones: Liverpool FC footballer.
 David Jones (VC): Recipient of the Victoria Cross.
 Jack Jones: Union leader.
 Ken Jones: Actor, appeared in TV shows such as The Liver Birds, The Squirrels and Jesus of Nazareth.
 Laurence Jones: Blues rock musician.
 Natasha Jonas: Professional boxer, WBC.WBO.IBF World Champion.
 Philip Jones (Royal Navy officer): First Sea Lord and Chief of the Naval Staff.
 Simon Jones (musician): Bass guitarist in the rock band The Verve.
 Stephen Jones (milliner).

 K 
Miles Kane: Musician, originally from the Wirral, best known as co-frontman of the Last Shadow Puppets and former frontman of the Rascals.
Ben Kay: Rugby union player, member of England 2003 Rugby World Cup winning team.
 Gillian Kearney: Actress, Casualty, Emmerdale.
 Gillian Keegan: Politician, brought up in  Liverpool.
 Margret Kelly: Swimmer, Olympic silver medalist.
 Angela Kelly: Royal Victorian Order, Fashion Designer and Dress Maker, who served as Personal Assistant and senior dresser to  The Queen of United Kingdom, Elizabeth II.
 Stan Kelly-Bootle: Academic, author, folk singer and songwriter. Songs include Liverpool Lullaby. Author of several books on computing.
 Paul Aloysius Kenna: Victoria Cross recipient.
 Sir Anthony Kenny: Academic, writer on religion and philosophy, former President of the British Academy and current President of the Royal Institute of Philosophy.
 Bill Kenwright: Theatre supremo and Everton F.C. chairman.
 Edmund Kirby: Architect.
 Josh Kirby: Artist and illustrator.
John Kirk (VC): Recipient of The Victoria Cross.
Billy Kirsopp: Footballer, Everton F.C.
Billy J. Kramer: Pop Singer.

 L 
 Brian Labone: Footballer, Everton F.C. England international.
 Alexander Lafone: Victoria Cross recipient.
 John Laird: Founder of Cammell Laird, A ship building and repair company founded in 1828.
 Macgregor Laird: Founder of the British and American Steam Navigation Company ( SS Sirius was the first holder of the Blue Riband) also founded African Steamship Company.
 Rickie Lambert: Footballer, England international.
 John Lander (rower): won gold medalist in the 1928 Olympics in Amsterdam.
 Judd Lander: Musician, director at Warner Music Group, Harmonicist on Culture Club Karma Chameleon.
 Charlie Landsborough: Musician and songwriter Country singer.
 Carla Lane: Television writer., creator of sitcoms such as The Liver Birds, Butterflies and Bread.
 Lynda La Plante: Screenwriter and actress.
 James Larkin: Trade unionist and socialist.
 Frank Laskier: WWII sailor who was a public icon for recruiting new mariners.
 Eddie Latta: Songwriter, noted songs for George Formby.
 Chris Lawler: Footballer, Liverpool F.C. and England international.
 Fred Lawless: Playwright and television writer.
 Terry Leahy: Businessman, credited with taking Tesco to market dominance.
 Zack Lee: Martial art actor.
 Sammy Lee: Footballer, coach of the England national football team and was a member of Joe Fagan team that won the 1984 European Cup Final
 Spencer Leigh: Film and TV actor.
 Spencer Leigh: Presenter of the BBC Radio Merseyside show On the Beat.
 Cynthia Lennon: Artist, author and first wife of John Lennon and mother of Julian Lennon.
 John Lennon: Singer and songwriter inducted into the Rock and Roll Hall of Fame as a member of The Beatles and later John Lennon/Plastic Ono Band.
 Julian Lennon: Musician, photographer and philanthropist, son of John and Cynthia Lennon.
 Frank Lester (VC): Recipient of the Victoria Cross.
 Brian Leveson: High Court judge.
 David Lewis: Businessman.
 Frederick Richards Leyland: Shipping magnete, The  of the Leyland Line was the closest to the RMS Titanic as she sank.
 Phil Liggett: Sports commentator.
 Jimmy Lloyd (boxer): who won a Bronze medal at the 1960 Summer Olympics.
 Matt Lloyd: British sledge hockey player.
 Janice Long: Influential Radio 1 DJ of the 1980s. Sister of Keith Chegwin.
 Gordon Lorenz: Record producer and songwriter, writing There's No One Quite Like Grandma.
 Malcolm Lowry: Poet and Novelist.
 Gertrud Luckner:
 Sir Henry Lucy: Political journalist, acknowledged as the first great Lobby correspondent, Mount Henry Lucy is named after him.
Arthur Lyon (rugby union): Played in the world's first international rugby match and also the first international match in any code of football.
Mick Lyons: Footballer, Everton F.C.
 Nigel Lythgoe: Former dancer, now producer of talent shows such as American Idol and So You Think You Can Dance.

 M 
 Donald MacAlister: Educated at Liverpool Institute for Boys.
 William MacDonald: Serial killer who committed his crimes in Australia.
 Charles R. MacIver: Olympic silver medallist and a member of the celebrated Liverpool shipping family.
 David MacIver: Shipping magnate, owner of the Cunnard steamship company.
 Hattie Mahood: Baptist deacon, suffragist and temperance campaigner.
 Betty Marsden: Actress, In Round the Horn and Carry on Camping.
 Gerry Marsden: Lead singer, songwriter and guitarist with Gerry and the Pacemakers.
 John P. Marshall: Investor and owner of Vác FC and Egri FC.
 Alvin Martin: Footballer, England international.
 John Martin: Comedian.
 Frank Mason (jockey): Grand National winner.
 Charles James Mathews: Actor, theatre manager and playwright.
 Derry Mathews: Professional boxer, former British and Commonwealth champion.
 Robert Maudsley: Serial killer.
 Sharon Maughan: Actress, Holby City and Gold Blend.
 Lee Mavers: Singer-songwriter and rhythm guitarist with the La's.
 James Maybrick: Victorian cotton merchant whose supposed diary contain a confession for the crimes of Jack the Ripper (though this is held by most authorities to be a crude forgery).
 Michael Maybrick: Composer and singer.
 Jason McAteer: Footballer, Republic of Ireland international.
 Les McAteer: Professional boxer, British middle weight and Commonwealth champion.
 Pat McAteer: Professional boxer, British middle weight and Commonwealth champion.
 Dave McCabe: Singer and songwriter, guitarist in The Zutons.
 John McCabe (composer).
 Nick McCabe: Guitarist with rock band The Verve.
 Donald Ginger McCain: Racehorse trainer four-time winner of the Grand National Steeplechase three times with Red Rum.
 Molly McCann: Mixed martial artist, UFC fighter flyweight.
 Sir Paul McCartney: Singer and songwriter inducted into the Rock and Roll Hall of Fame as a member of The Beatles and later Wings, also founded MPL Communications.
 Jim McCarty: Musician inducted into the Rock and Roll Hall of Fame as a member of The Yardbirds.
 Liz McClarnon: Singer, member of the former girl group Atomic Kitten.
 Andy McCluskey: Musician, singer-songwriter with OMD. and founder of Atomic Kitten.
 Len McCluskey: General secretary of Unite the Union.
 Natalie McCool: Singer, songwriter and guitarist signed to Steve Levine's label Hubris Records.
 Ian McCulloch: Lead singer of Echo & the Bunnymen.
 Herbert Gladstone McDavid: : (1898–1966) war-time minister of sea transport, managing director of Blue Funnel Line,  Her capture may have influenced Japan's decision to enter the Second World War.
Terry McDermott: Footballer., Liverpool F.C. and England international won three European Cup winners medals.
 Roy McFarland: Footballer, England international.
 Joe McGann: Actor, Casualty and played Edward Hutchinson in Hollyoaks.
 Mark McGann: Actor, played John Lennon in the TV movie John and Yoko: A Love Story and several other TV credits.
 Paul McGann: Actor, starred in cult classic film Withnail and I, The Monocled Mutineer and Doctor Who, amongst others.
 Stephen McGann: Actor and science communicator best known for his portrayal of Dr. Turner in Call the Midwife.
 Mike McGear: Photographer, musician, member of The Scaffold, younger brother of Beatles bassist Paul McCartney.
 Roger McGough: Performance poet.
 Jimmy McGovern: Initially a writer on Brookside he went on to write Cracker starring Robbie Coltrane and the film Priest as well as the reality based drama Hillsborough.
 Victor McGuire: Actor.
 Hugh McKenzie (VC): Victoria Cross recipient.
Steve McMahon: Footballer Liverpool F.C., Everton F.C. and England international.
 Steve McManaman: Footballer, Liverpool F.C., Real Madrid CF and England international, he became the first English player to win the UEFA Champions League with a non- English club and first English player to win it twice.
 Jack McMullen: Actor.
 Ian McNabb: Singer/Songerwriter with The Icicle Works.
 John McNally: Musician and singer of  The Searchers.
Jimmy Melia: Footballer, Liverpool F.C.
 George Melly: Jazz and blues singer; art critic and historian.
 John Middleton (giant): Claimed at the time to be the tallest man in the world, lived in Speke Hall.
 John Milne: professor, geologist, and mining engineer, who invented a pioneering Seismometer to detect and measure earthquakes.
Joey Molland: Rock and roll guitarist, singer and songwriter, from the band Badfinger.
Tommy Molloy: Professional boxer, British Welterweight champion.
Dick Molyneux: Football manager, Merseyside's first league championship winning manager.
George Molyneux: Footballer, Everton F.C. and England international.
 Stephen Molyneux: British e-Learning guru.
 Nicholas Monsarrat: Author of The Cruel Sea.
 Dr Benjamin Moore: Is credited with the first use of the words National Health Service and the foundation of the State Medical Service Association.
Peter Moore: British-American business executive.
 Pippa Moore: Ballet dancer.
 John Moores: Businessman and founder of Littlewoods Pools.
 George Moorhouse: Footballer, played in the 1930 FIFA World Cup and 1934 FIFA World Cup, The first English footballer to play in a FIFA World Cup.
 Mark Moraghan: Actor, in Holby City and narrator of Thomas & Friends.
Trevor Morais: Musician and drummer.
 Ronnie Moran: Footballer, Liverpool F.C.  a member of the Boot Room coaching staff.
 Fidelis Morgan: Actress and writer.
 Sally Morgan, Baroness Morgan of Huyton: Politician, member of the House of Lords.
 Steve Morgan Philanthropist, former chairman of Wolverhampton Wanders FC.
 Jerry Morris: Pioneer public health physician and reformer.
 Robert Morris: American financier and signatory of the Declaration of Independence, one of the Founding Fathers of the United States.
 Roger Morris: Pioneering railway engineer.
Tom Morris: Founder of the Variety store Home Bargains.
 David Morrissey: Actor.
 Johnny Morrissey: Footballer, Liverpool F.C. and Everton F.C.
 Dennis Mortimer: Footballer, Captain of Aston Villa F.C. in the 1982 European Cup Final.
 Derek Mountfield: Footballer.
 Bernie Mullin: Sports executive and writer.
 Jimmy Mulville: Comedian, comedy writer, producer and television presenter.
 John Murphy: Musician and composer.
 Margaret Murphy: Crime novelist.
Tom Murphy: Artist and bronze sculptor.
 Max Muspratt: Chemist and politician.
 Jonathan Myles-Lea: Painter.

 N 
 Ken Nelson: Record Producer and three-time Grammy Awards winner with Coldplay.
 Brian Nash: Musician.
 Mike Newell Footballer, Blackburn Rovers.
 John Newton: Liverpool sea captain who composed ‘’Amazing Grace’’.
 Vincent Nichols: Leader of England's Roman Catholics.
 Elizabeth Nickell-Lean: Operatic singer.
 Derek Nimmo: Actor.
 Kevin Nolan: Footballer.
 Stephen Norris: Politician and businessman.
Sally Nugent: journalist, TV presenter BBC Breakfast.

 O 
Jack O'Connell: Sheffield United footballer.
 Tom O'Connor: Comedian and former quiz show host.
 Paul O'Grady: Actor, author, comedian, radio DJ, television presenter.
 Nigel Olsson: Musician, Rock drummer and singer, member of the Elton John Band.
 Anyika Onuora: British Olympics sprinter.
 Brian Oulton: Actor.
 Phina Oruche: Actress, Model.
 Mark O'Toole (musician): Singer songwriter in Frankie Goes to Hollywood.
 Alun Owen: Screenwriter, Brought up in Liverpool noted for writing the Beatles film A Hard Day's Night (film).
 Sir William Leonard Owen: Engineer, nuclear engineering.
 Ronald Oxburgh, Baron Oxburgh: Member of the House of Lords, Geologist, Geophysics.

 P 
 Louis Page: Footballer, England international.
 Mark Palios: Footballer, former chief executive of The Football Association.
 Amy Parkinson (1855–1938): Poet.
 Jack Parkinson: Footballer, Liverpool F.C. and England international.
 Lily Parr: The only woman to be inducted into the English Football Hall of Fame.
 Nikita Parris: Footballer, Women's England International.
 John Parrott: World Championship-winning snooker player and television personality.
 Alan Parry: TV football commentator.
 Rick Parry: Chairman of the EFL and former chief executive of the Premier League.
 Brian Patten: Poet.
 Larry Paul: Professional boxer, former British light-middleweight champion.
 Mike Pender: Musician, lead guitar and lead vocalist of The Searchers.
 Tricia Penrose: Actress who played Gina in the TV series Heartbeat.
 Lady Mary Peters: Athlete, Pentathlon Gold medalist in the 1972 Munich Olympic Games.
 George Philip: Cartographer, map publisher and founder of the publishing house George Philip & Son, Ltd.
 Dom Phillips: Journalist.
 Percy Phillips: Recording engineer, Noted for early recordings of The Quarrymen, A Blue plaque marks is former home.
 Tony Phillips: Artist and printmaker
James Picton: Architect and politician.
Paddy Pimblett: Mixed Martial Artists, UFC fighter Lightweight.
 John Power: Singer and songwriter with Cast and bassist with the La's.
 Philip Louis Pratley: Architect and Civil engineer.
 Edward Carter Preston: Sculpture and Medalist.
 Steve Prestwich: Former drummer from Australian band Cold Chisel.
 David Price: Professional boxer, former British and Commonwealth heavyweight champion.
 Arthur Herbert Procter: Victoria Cross recipient.
 Dominic Purcell: Actor, played Lincoln Burrows in Prison Break.
 Richard Pyros: Actor.

 Q 

 Anthony Quayle: British actor and theatre director.
 Sam Quek: Hockey player, Gold Medallists in 2016 Summer Olympics and first female captain of Question of Sport.
 Richard Quest: CNN TV presenter and journalist.
 Tony Quigley: Professional boxer, former British Super middleweight champion.
 Abdullah Quilliam: Founder of Britain's  first Mosque and Islamic centre.
Micky Quinn:  Footballer and racehorse trainer.
 Ray Quinn: Actor and singer.

 R 
 Heidi Range: Singer with the Sugababes.
 Augustus Radcliffe Grote: A British Entomologist.
 William Ratcliffe: Victoria Cross recipient.
 Eleanor Rathbone: Campaigner on women's rights and a member of the noted Liverpool Rathbone family.
 William Rathbone VI: Businessman, politician, father of English district nursing, established Liverpool Training School and Home for Nurses and the Queen's Nursing Institute.
 Sir Simon Rattle: Orchestra conductor.
 Austin Rawlinson: Swimmer, Inducted into the International Swimming Hall of Fame.
 Paul Raymond (publisher) Dubbed the “ King of Soho”
 Jack Rea: NXT UK wrestler.
 Phil Redmond: Television writer, producer, created Grange Hill, Brookside, Hollyoaks and Emmerdale.
 Peter Reid: Footballer, Everton F.C. and England international.
 Robin Reid Professional boxer, WBC World champion who won a Bronze medal at the 1992 Summer Olympics.
 James Renwick: Scientist and engineer, his son James Renwick Jr. was a noted architect of St. Patrick's Cathedral (Midtown Manhattan) New York.
 Arthur Herbert Lindsay Richardson: Victoria Cross recipient.
 Miranda Richardson: Actress.
 Bill Ridding: Footballer, 1958 FA Cup Final winning manager.
 Ellis Rimmer: Footballer, England international.
 Jimmy Rimmer: Footballer, (Goalkeeper) became the first English footballer to win European Cup with two clubs.
 John Rimmer: Athlete, Olympic gold medalist.
 Kate Robbins: Impressionist, cousin of Paul McCartney, sister of Ted Robbins.
 Ted Robbins: Comic, actor and broadcaster, cousin of Paul McCartney, brother of Kate Robbins.
 Nigel Roberts: Computer scientist born in Liverpool.
 Anne Robinson: Journalist, host of TV game show The Weakest Link.
 Sir Ken Robinson: Educationalist.
 Robert Robinson: TV presenter, radio presenter and writer.
 James Roby: Rugby league international for England rugby league team and Great Britain national rugby league team.
 Ernie Roderick: Professional boxer,  British and European Welterweight and Middleweight champion.
 Alfred Edward Rodewald: Musician.
 Bill Rodgers: Politician and member of SDP "Gang of Four".
 Wayne Rooney: Footballer, Head coach of D.C. United, Manchester United and England international all-time record goal scorer.
 Paul Rooney: Visual and sound artist.
 William Roscoe: Anti-slavery campaigner and poet, whose work was translated into French, German, and other languages.
 Milton Rosmer: Actor, in roles in Atlantic Ferry.
 Norman Rossington: Actor, best remembered for is roles in The Beatles film A Hard Day's Night (film) and Double Trouble starring Elvis Presley.
 Leonard Rossiter: Actor who played Landlord Rigsby in the Yorkshire TV series Rising Damp, and the title character in The Fall and Rise of Reginald Perrin and other roles.
 Patricia Routledge: Actress, star of Keeping Up Appearances.
 Geoff Rowley: Pro skate boarder.
 Stan Rowan: Professional boxer, British and British Empire Bantamweight Champion.
 Herbert James Rowse: Architect whose works included India Buildings and Martins Bank Building.
 Dr Agness Maude Royden: Suffragist, author, preacher, philosopher, pacifist, who was in The Black Book.
 Thomas Royden, 1st Baron Royden: Founder of Thomas Royden & Sons, A Shipbuilding company founded in 1818–1893.
 Joe Royle: Footballer,England international, Manager of Everton F.C.
 Lita Roza: Singer, first female singer to have a number one record in the UK music charts. 
 Alan Rudkin:Professional boxer, former British and  Commonwealth and European champion.
 Robert Runcie: Anglican archbishop.
Edward Rushton: Blind anti-slavery campaigner who founded the Royal school of the blind the world's oldest school for the blind in continuous operation.
 Willy Russell: Playwright.
 John Rylands: (1801–1888) Victorian owner of the largest Textile company.

 S 
 Herbert Samuel: Liberal statesman
 Robert Sangster: (1936–2004) businessman, Vernons Pools Magnate, Racehorse owner/breeder, that established the Coolmore Stud.
 Sir Charles Santley: Opera singer, the first singer to be honoured with a Knighthood.
 Sunetra Sarker: Actress.
 Paul Sass: UFC fighter.
 Kevin Satchell: Professional boxer, former British, commonwealth and European champion.
 Ron Saunders: Former Aston Villa F.C. manager who won the league then the European cup in the 1981–82 Aston Villa F.C. season.
 Jill Saward: Campaigner
 Alexei Sayle: Comedian and writer.
 Gia Scala: Actress.
 Gustav Christian Schwabe: Hamburg-born financier.
Richard Seddon: Politician, former Prime Minister of New Zealand.
 Peter Serafinowicz: Actor and comic writer, his most notable work includes penning the satire Look Around You, and voicing Darth Maul in Star Wars: Episode I – The Phantom Menace.
 Will Sergeant: Musician, guitarist in Echo and the Bunnymen.
 Reginald Servaes: Commander, Vice admiral.
 Anthony Shaffer: Dramatist of Sleuth and The Wicker Man. Twin brother of Peter Shaffer.
 Peter Shaffer: Dramatist of Equus and Amadeus. Twin brother of Anthony Shaffer.
 Christopher Shannon: Menswear designer
 Chris Sharrock: Drummer for the band Beady Eye, former member of The Icicle Works, The La's and Oasis.
 Chris Shepherd: Writer, director and animator.
 Kate Sheppard: Born in Liverpool became New Zealand's most famous suffragette.
 Cornelius Sherlock: Architect of the Walker Art Gallery.
 Danny Shone: Footballer.
 Peter Shore: Labour politician.
 Pete Shotton: Businessman, member of The Quarrymen that later became The Beatles.
 Mark Simpson: Composer and clarinettist.
 Joey Singleton: Professional boxer, former British light-welterweight champion.
 Peter Sissons: Journalist & newsreader.
 James Skelly: Musician, songwriter and Record producer, The Coral.
 Elisabeth Sladen: Actress, best remembered as a Doctor Who assistant.
 Edward Smith: Captain of the RMS Titanic, lived and worked in Crosby, Liverpool between (1867–1907).
 Sir John Smith: Football chairman, Liverpool F.C..
 Paul Smith: Professional boxer, former British super-middleweight champion.
 Stephen Smith: Professional boxer, former British and Commonwealth champion.
 Liam Smith: Professional boxer, former WBO World light-middleweight champion.
 Callum Smith: Professional boxer, former WBA (Super) and Ring World Super middleweight Champion.
 Michael Smith (darts player). World Champion in 2023.
 Tommy Smith: Footballer, Liverpool F.C., former owner of The Cavern Club.
 Herbert Tyson Smith: Artist and Sculptor.
 Sonia: Pop singer.
 Frank Soo: (1914–1991) Footballer, Brought up in Liverpool he was the first and only person from Chinese or Asian background to play for the England national football team.
 Edward Smith-Stanley, 14th Earl of Derby: Three-time Prime Minister of the United Kingdom, he is noted to be the longest serving Party leader in British history.
 Frederick Stanley, 16th Earl of Derby: Lord Mayor of Liverpool, Governor General of Canada and gifted the country the Stanley Cup, Founder of Stanley House Stables.
 Edward Stanley, 18th Earl of Derby: President of the Professional Golfers’ Association who was involved in the change for the inclusion of continental European golfers in The Ryder Cup since 1979.
 Olaf Stapledon: Author.
 Graham Stark: Actor.
 Michael Starke: Actor.
 Freddie Starr: Comedian, impressionist, singer and 1994 Grand National-winning owner.
 Sir Ringo Starr: Musician, Singer and songwriter who is  inducted into the Rock and Roll Hall of Fame as a member of The Beatles and later Ringo Starr & His All-Starr Band.
 Zak Starkey: Drummer, member of rock band The Who, The son of The Beatles drummer Ringo Starr and Maureen Starkey Tigrett.
 Alison Steadman: Actress.
 A. G. Steel: amateur cricketer, noted for recording the first Test Century and Five-wicket haul at Lords cricket ground.
 Robert Steel: (1839–1903) Chess player, noted for conceived of and organised the world’s first international, long-distance chess match.
 Adrian Scott Stokes: Artist known for his landscape paintings.
 Wilfred Stokes: Inventor of the Stokes mortar, chairman and managing director of Ransomes & Rapier.
 Robert Stopford: Bishop of London.
 Gordon Stretton: Musician, Credited with introducing Jazz to Latin America.
 Ronald Stuart: Victoria Cross recipient.
 Alan Stubbs: Everton FC footballer.
 George Stubbs: Artist known for his paintings of horses.
 Kenny Swain: One of the four footballers from Merseyside that was a member of Ron Saunders team that won the league and 1982 European Cup Final with Aston Villa FC.
 Stuart Sutcliffe: Early member of the Beatles.
 Claire Sweeney: Actress, singer and television presenter.
 Clive Swift: Actor, played Richard Bucket in Keeping Up Appearances.
 David Swift: Actor.
 Joy Swift: Inventor of the murder mystery weekend.
 John Samuel Swire: Shipping magnate, founder of China Navigation Company and the Swire group.
Terry Sylvester: Singer and songwriter inducted into the Rock and Roll Hall of Fame as a member of the Hollies.
 Magda Szubanski : Australian actress born in Liverpool.

 T 
 Raymond Tallis: Professor of Geriatric Medicine and poet.
 Jimmy Tarbuck: Comedian, entertainer, TV host.
 Liza Tarbuck: Actress, television and radio presenter, daughter of Jimmy Tarbuck.
 Banastre Tarleton: British cavalry officer in the American War of Independence.
 Nel Tarleton: Professional boxer, British champion on three separate occasions and first to win the Lonsdale Belt outright twice.
 Tanya Tate: Award-winning adult film star.
 Derek Taylor: Record producer, Publicist for The Beatles, The Byrds, The Beach Boys, The Mamas & the Papas.
 Jodie Taylor: Arsenal and England footballer.
 Ted Taylor: Footballer, (Goalkeeper) England international.
 Derek Temple: Footballer Everton F.C.
 Wally Thom: Professional boxer, won the Lonsdale Belt outright, European and Commonwealth champion on two separate occasions.
 Heidi Thomas: Screenwriter and playwright best known for screen adaptations including Capture The Castle, Cranford, and Call the Midwife.
 Walter Aubrey Thomas: Architect, noted works include the Royal Liver Building.
George Thompson (abolitionist): One of the most important Abolitionism and Human rights lecturers in the UK and US.
Sir Ivan Thompson: Commodore of the Cunard Line.
 Phil Thompson: Footballer, Captain of Liverpool F.C. in the 1981 European Cup Final, Captain of the England national football team.
 Bill Tidy: Cartoonist.
 Dick Tiger: Nigerian world boxing champion, lived in Liverpool.
 Darren Till, Mixed Martial Artist, UFC Welterweight.
 Frank Tobin: Played in the world's first international rugby match,also the first international match in any code of Football.
 Ricky Tomlinson: Actor and comedian.
 Mirabel Topham: Actress, Former owner of Aintree Racecourse home of The Grand National Steeplechase.
 Robert Tressell: Irish writer of The Ragged-Trousered Philanthropists who lived in Liverpool.
 William Thomas Turner: Captain of Cunard ship RMS ‘’’Lusitania’’’, on its Sinking.
 George Turpin: Boxer who won a bronze medal at the 1972 Summer Olympics
 Rita Tushingham: Actress.
 Tommy Tynan: Footballer.
 Cathy Tyson: Actress.

 V 
 Henry Hill Vale: Architect, co-designed the Walker Art Gallery
 Frankie Vaughan: Singer, dancer and film actor.
 Ivan Vaughan: Musician and author, Responsible for Introducing Lennon to McCartney.
 Colin Vearncombe: Singer Aka 'Black' who had a big hit with "Wonderful Life" in 1987
 William Vestey, 1st Baron Vestey: Shipping magnate of the Blue Star Line and the Vestey Group, pioneers of refrigeration and cold storage.
 Sir Edmund Vestey, 1st Baronet: co-founder of Vestey Group, the Dewhurst butchers chain.

 W 
 Pete Wade: Blues/rock guitarist with Engine, and Connie Lush & Blues Shouter.
 Neville Wadia: Chairman of Bombay Dyeing.
 James Iredell Waddell: Commander of the Liverpool ship  the vessel was surrendered in Liverpool marking the last official surrender of the American Civil War.
 Tony Waddington: Songwriter, Record producer.
 Charles Wakefield, 1st Viscount Wakefield: Founder of Castrol Lubricant company. 
 Captain Frederic John Walker: The most successful Anti-submarine warfare commander during the Battle of the Atlantic that was based in Liverpool.
 Horace Walker: Mountaineer who made many notable first ascents, including Mount Elbrus and Grandes Jorasses.
 Lucy Walker: Pioneer mountainer, the first woman to climb the Matterhorn.
 William Walker, 1st Baron Wavertree: Grand National winning owner who helped establish The National Stud and Irish National Stud.
 Nigel Walley: Musician,
 Joan Walmsley, Baroness Walmsley: Politician, Member of the House of Lords.
 Jonathan Walters: Footballer, Republic of Ireland international.
 Stephen Walters: Actor.
 Tom Waring: Footballer, England International.
 Curtis Warren: Gangster.
 William Warwick: The first Captain of the ‘’QE2’’ ocean liner, his son Commodore Ronald W. Warwick was also the first Master of the largest ocean liner in the world, ’’Queen Mary 2’’.
 Alfred Waterhouse: Architect,
 Edwin Waterhouse: Accountant, co-founded PricewaterhouseCoopers.
 Sid Watkins: President of Fédération Internationale de l'Automobile and Formula One institute of motorsport safety.
 Emma Watkinson: Businesswoman.
 Andrew Watson (footballer, born 1856): Likely to be the first black professional footballer in history playing for Bootle F.C. (1879).
 Billy Watson (footballer, born 1890): England international.
 Dave Watson: Footballer, Everton F.C. and England.
 Jamie Webster: Singer and songwriter.
 Richie Wenton: Professional boxer, former British Super bantamweight champion.
 Frank Westerton: Stage and silent-film actor
 James Wharton: Pioneer boxer who is inducted into International Boxing Hall of Fame.
 Albert White (VC): Victoria Cross recipient.
 Charley White: Professional boxer, World title challenger on several occasions.
 Wildman Whitehouse: Inventor, sent the first Telecommunications to the United States of America.
 Alan Whittle: Footballer, Everton F.C.
 Dame May Whitty: Film Actress, her grandfather was Michael James Whitty founder of the Liverpool Daily Post.
 Henry Tingle Wilde: Chief officer on the RMS Titanic
 Kitty Wilkinson
 Anne Williams (activist): Campaigner of Justice.
 Cliff Williams: Musician, inducted into the Rock and Roll Hall of Fame as a member of AC/DC, brought up in Merseyside town Hoylake.
 Martyn S. Williams: A mountain and wilderness guide who is the first person in the world to lead expeditions to the three extremes, South Pole (1989) North Pole (1992) and Everest (1991).
 Michael Williams (actor) Actor.
 Joseph Williamson: Philanthropist and builder of Williamson's tunnels.
 Bobby Willis: Songwriter, husband and manager of Cilla Black.
 Tony Willis: Professional boxer, British champion and won Bronze medal in the 1980 Summer Olympics.
 Harold Wilson: Former prime minister, educated at Wirral Grammar School for Boys and a member of parliament of Huyton from 1950 to 1983, A statue was erected in Huyton town centre in 2006.
 Robb Wilton: Comedian.
 Peter Withe: Footballer, Aston Villa F.C. England international scored the winning goal in the 1982 European Cup Final.
 Gustav Wilhelm Wolff: Hamburg-born Co-founder of Harland & Wolff A Shipbuilding Company founded in 1861.
Max Woosnam: England International footballer who won Wimbledon tennis doubles, and winning a Gold medal in the 1920 Summer Olympics.
Eleanor Worthington-Cox: Actress.
 Emma Wray: Actress, played Brenda Wilson in the Granada TV sitcom Watching.
 Tommy Wright (footballer, born 1944) Everton F.C. England international.
 Pete Wylie: Singer songwriter "The Mighty Wah!".
 Arthur Wynne: Inventor of the Crossword puzzle.

 Y 
 Mal Young: Television producer and executive who has overseen shows such as Brookside, EastEnders, The Bill and Doctor Who''.
 David Yip: Actor.
 Ozzie Yue: Actor, musician for Merseybeat group   The Hideaways (band).

Z 
 Benjamin Zand: Journalist.
 Anne Ziegler: Singer.

See also 
 List of bands and artists from Merseyside

References

External links 

People from Merseyside
Lists of English people by location